Oer-Erkenschwick is a town in the district of Recklinghausen, in North Rhine-Westphalia, Germany. It is situated approximately 5 km north-east of Recklinghausen, on the northern periphery of the Ruhrgebiet. When pronouncing the name, “Oer” should be pronounced like the German Ohr, not Ör.

Geography
Oer-Erkenschwick is situated east of the city of Recklinghausen and on the southern edge of the Hohe Mark Nature Park.

Sports
The town is the home of football club SpVgg Erkenschwick.

Twin towns – sister cities

Oer-Erkenschwick is twinned with:

 Alanya, Turkey
 Halluin, France
 Kočevje, Slovenia
 Lübbenau, Germany
 North Tyneside, England, United Kingdom
 Pniewy, Poland

Notable people
Moondog (1916–1999), American musician and composer, lived there for a while
Horst Szymaniak (1934–2009), footballer
Klaus Wennemann (1940–2000), actor

References

Towns in North Rhine-Westphalia
Recklinghausen (district)